Isabella Lövin (born 3 February 1963) is a Swedish politician for the Green Party. She served as Minister for International Development Cooperation from 2014 to 2019, as Minister for the Environment from 2019 to 2021 and as honorary Deputy Prime Minister of Sweden from 2016 to 2021. She led the Green Party as co-spokesperson from 2016 to 2021, sharing the task with Gustav Fridolin (2014-2019) and Per Bolund (2019-2021).

An author and journalist by profession, Lövin served as a Member of European Parliament (MEP) from the 2009 election until becoming cabinet minister in October 2014. Her area in the European Parliament was fisheries questions. Lövin has been awarded with Stora Journalistpriset for her work in the field of journalism, particularly her articles about fishery.

On 26 August 2020, Lövin announced her resignation from politics altogether. She will remain in office until a new spokesperson is appointed in 2021.

Early life and education 
Lövin is the daughter of artist Björn Lövin. She studied film studies, political science, sociology and Italian at Stockholm University. She also studied at the University College of Film, Radio, Television and Theatre.

Career
Lövin has been reporter and freelance writer for Damernas Värld, Veckorevyn, Elle and Vi Föräldrar, and written chronicles about the environment in Expressen's Sunday supplement "Green Sunday". From 1994 to 1997, Lövin worked as a reporter and producer at Sveriges Radio P1's community editorial board for programs such as Slussen and Tendens. Subsequently, she worked as editorial secretary and editor of Månadsjournalen until 2002 when she, after having been an editor at food magazine Allt om Mat, worked as editor of magazine Leva! in 2003. In 2004, Lövin was re freelance writer and in 2005 she wrote columns for Allt om Mat and concurrently served as a freelance web editor for Femina.

Her 2007 book on fishing policy was published into English in 2012 under the title Silent seas: the fish race to the bottom.

Political career

Member of the European Parliament, 2009–2014 
Lövin was elected to the European Parliament in the 2009 European Parliament election, as a member of the Green Party. She was re-elected in the 2014 European Parliament election and was appointed as vice chair of the Committee on Fisheries. She served as special rapporteur of the external dimension of the Common Fisheries Policy and the role of the EU in fighting illegal fisheries globally.

In September 2010 Lövin voted in favour of the Draft report on enhancing the enforcement of intellectual property rights in the internal market. The critics, among them the Pirate Party and the Young Greens, found this motion contradictory to the Green Party's stance on CopyRight. Lövin stated that the vote was aligned with party politics and that her vote had been in favour of protecting the rights of small artists to get paid for their work.

In 2013, Lövin was one of four Members of the European Parliament who were turned back by Moroccan authorities en route to the disputed territory of Western Sahara; the cross-party group of MEPs had been on a fact-finding mission on human rights in the region.

Minister for International Development Cooperation, 2014–2019 
Lövin was appointed Minister for International Development Cooperation on 3 October 2014 by Prime Minister Stefan Löfven.

Green Party spokesperson, 2016–2021 
On 9 May 2016, Lövin was nominated by her party's national election committee to succeed Åsa Romson as one of two spokespersons of the Green Party.

Lövin gained international recognition in February 2017 from her post on social media showing her surrounded by seven female colleagues while signing a climate goal referral. This was perceived by many in the public as a criticism of US president Donald Trumps signing of executive orders on abortion rights in the company of only male colleagues. Lövin has commented that the photograph demonstrates that Sweden is a feminist government and that it is up to the observer to interpret its message.

Minister for the Environment, 2019–2021 
Lövin was appointed Minister for the Environment on 21 January 2019 by Prime Minister Stefan Löfven.

Other activities
 Multilateral Investment Guarantee Agency (MIGA), World Bank Group, Ex-Officio Alternate Member of the Board of Governors
 World Bank, Ex-Officio Alternate Member of the Board of Governors

References

External links 
 Official website
 

1963 births
Living people
Swedish Ministers for International Development Cooperation
Women government ministers of Sweden
Green Party (Sweden) politicians
Green Party (Sweden) MEPs
MEPs for Sweden 2009–2014
MEPs for Sweden 2014–2019
21st-century women MEPs for Sweden
21st-century Swedish women politicians
Swedish Ministers for the Environment
Dramatiska Institutet alumni
Stockholm University alumni